Sister Aimee is a 2019 American biographical film written and directed by Samantha Buck and Marie Schlingmann and starring Anna Margaret Hollyman as Aimee Semple McPherson.  It is a fictionalized account of McPherson's 1926 disappearance.

Cast
Julie White
Amy Hargreaves
Anna Margaret Hollyman
Andrea Suarez Paz
Jordan Elsass
Michael Mosley
Blake DeLong
John Merriman
Macon Blair
Bill Wise

Production
The film was shot in Texas and New Mexico.

Release
The film was shown at the 2019 Sundance Film Festival and the 2019 South by Southwest Film Festival.  It was then released in select theaters on September 27, 2019 and on VOD on October 1, 2019.

Reception
The film has  rating on Rotten Tomatoes.  Kate Erbland of IndieWire graded the film a B−.  Norman Gidney of Film Threat gave the film seven stars out of ten.

Candice Frederick of TheWrap gave the film a negative review and wrote, "The gendered themes at play here do little to boost the quality of Buck and Schlingmann’s storytelling, which is too tangled to follow at times." Beandrea July of The Hollywood Reporter also gave the film a negative review and wrote, "Buck and Schlingmann have ideas, but they just don’t add up to something impactful here."

References

External links
 
 

American biographical films
Films set in 1926
Films shot in New Mexico
Films shot in Texas
1091 Media films
2010s English-language films
2010s American films